The 2022 KBS Song Festival was the 12th edition of KBS Song Festival, broadcast live from Jamsil Arena by KBS 2TV at 8:30 pm KST on Friday, December 16, 2022. A total of 24 teams were invited to the show.

The theme for the year was "Newtro", a transformation aiming to cater to the tastes of all generations. Kim Shin-young, Jang Won-young and Na In-woo hosted the show.

Background
On November 14, KBS announced that Na In-woo, Ive's Jang Won-young, and Kim Shin-young, were selected as MCs for the event. The application for attendance was held from 9:00 am on December 2, 2022.

On November 28, KBS released a graphic poster for the event, which is reminiscent of arcade games, implies that the music festival will have a Y2K theme, a hot trend among K-pop idols this 2022.

On November 30, KBS revealed the line-up, which included Koyote, BoA, Up10tion's Kim Woo-seok, NCT 127, NCT Dream, Pentagon, The Boyz, Fromis 9, Forestella, Stray Kids, (G)I-dle, Ateez, Choi Ye-na, Oneus, Itzy, Tomorrow X Together, STAYC, Aespa, Enhypen, Ive, Kep1er, Nmixx, Le Sserafim, and NewJeans. It was also revealed that the event would be directed by Bang Geul-yi, who directed KBS2's reality-variety show, 2 Days & 1 Night.

Performances

Notes

References

External links
 
 
 

Annual television shows
KBS Song Festival
December 2022 events in South Korea